The 2017 Ladies Open Biel Bienne was a women's tennis tournament played on indoor hard courts. It was the first edition of the Ladies Open Biel Bienne and part of the International category of the 2017 WTA Tour. It took place at the Swiss Tennis Center in Roger Federer Allee, Biel/Bienne, Switzerland, from 10 April through 16 April 2017.

Points and prize money

Point distribution

Prize money

Singles main draw entrants

Seeds

 1 Rankings are as of 3 April 2017.

Other entrants
The following players received wildcards into the main draw:
 Belinda Bencic
 Rebeka Masarova 
 Carla Suárez Navarro  

The following players received entry from the qualifying draw:
 Marie Bouzková
 Antonia Lottner  
 Aliaksandra Sasnovich
 Markéta Vondroušová

The following player received entry as a lucky loser:
  Lina Gjorcheska

Withdrawals
Before the tournament
 Alizé Cornet →replaced by  Lina Gjorcheska
 Kirsten Flipkens →replaced by  Mona Barthel
 Kristina Mladenovic →replaced by  Julia Boserup
 Tsvetana Pironkova →replaced by  Hsieh Su-wei
 Yaroslava Shvedova →replaced by  Jana Čepelová

Doubles main draw entrants

Seeds

1 Rankings are as of 3 April 2017.

Other entrants
The following pairs received wildcards into the main draw:
  Amandine Hesse /  Rebeka Masarova
  Ylena In-Albon /  Leonie Küng

Champions

Singles 

  Markéta Vondroušová def.  Anett Kontaveit, 6–4, 7–6(8–6)

Doubles 

  Hsieh Su-wei /  Monica Niculescu def.  Timea Bacsinszky /  Martina Hingis, 5–7, 6–3, [10–7]

References

External links 
 

Ladies Open Lugano
Ladies Open Biel Bienne
Ladies Open Biel Bienne
Lugano